Closer to the Sun is the fourth studio album by the band Slightly Stoopid, released in 2005. It debuted at #121 on the billboard 200

Track listing
 "Intro" - 1:17
 "Babylon Is Falling'" - 2:25
 "Somebody" - 2:52
 "Fat Spliffs" - 3:07
 "Bandelero" - 2:46
 "See It No Other Way" (featuring Barrington Levy and Mr. Mutton) - 3:53
 "Nothin Over Me" - 1:20
 "This Joint" - 4:07
 "Older" - 3:39
 "Ain't Got a Lot of Money" - 2:58
 "'Till It Gets Wet" - 2:37
 "Don't Care" (featuring Billy and Prof Most) - 4:39
 "Basher" - 2:31
 "Righteous Man" - 2:35
 "Up on a Plane" - 3:00
 "Waiting" - 2:54
 "Closer to the Sun" - 2:25
 "Zeplike" - 3:34
 "Comb 4 My Dome" - 1:29
 "Open Road" (contains the hidden track "Tom & Jerry") - 6:24

Samples
"Somebody" contains a sample of Da Mystery of Chessboxin' by Wu Tang Clan.

"Nothin Over Me" contains a sample of the theme and background music from the arcade game Xevious.

Charts

References

Slightly Stoopid albums
2005 albums